Kader Kohou (born November 28, 1998) is an American football cornerback for the Miami Dolphins of the National Football League (NFL). He played college football at Texas A&M–Commerce.

Early life 
Kader Kohou was born on November 28, 1998, in Abidjan, Côte d'Ivoire and is the son  of Elise Derou and Guy Kohou. He grew up in Euless, Texas and attended Trinity High School where he played football and ran track. During his senior season at Trinity he helped lead the Trinity Trojans to a district title and was named first-team all-district after leading the district in interceptions.

College career 
Kohou played football at Texas A&M University–Commerce. During his redshirt freshman season in 2017 he helped lead the Lions to a national championship title. During his career at A&M-Commerce he had 111 total tackles, 5 interceptions, 4 forced fumbles, 3 fumble recoveries and 2 defensive touchdowns, he also had 348 yards as a return specialist on special teams, He was named 2nd team all-conference in the Lone Star Conference in 2018 and 1st team all-conference in 2019.

Professional career

On April 30, 2022, Kohou signed with the Miami Dolphins as an undrafted free agent following the 2022 NFL Draft. He was one of the 53 players included on the final roster after cuts, and made his NFL debut Week 1 against the New England Patriots, having 3 tackles and a pass deflection.

References

External links
 Miami Dolphins bio
Texas A&M-Commerce Lions bio

1998 births
Living people
American football cornerbacks
American people of Ivorian descent
Ivorian players of American football
Players of American football from Texas
Ivorian emigrants to the United States
Miami Dolphins players
Sportspeople from Abidjan
Sportspeople of Ivorian descent
Texas A&M–Commerce Lions football players